David Levy Yulee (born David Levy; June 12, 1810 – October 10, 1886) was an American politician and attorney. Born on the island of St. Thomas, then under British control, he was of Sephardic Jewish ancestry: His father was a Sephardi from Morocco, and his mother, also of Sephardi descent, was born in Sint Eustatius and raised in St. Thomas. The family moved to Florida when he was a child, and he grew up there on their extensive lands. He later served as Florida's territorial delegate to Congress. Yulee was the first person of Jewish ancestry to be elected and serve as a United States senator, serving 1845–1851 and again 1855–1861. He founded the Florida Railroad Company and served as president of several other companies, earning the nickname of "Father of Florida Railroads." In 2000 he was recognized as a "Great Floridian" by the state.

Levy added Yulee, the name of one of his Moroccan ancestors, to his name soon after his 1846 marriage to Nancy Christian Wickliffe, daughter of ex-Governor Charles A. Wickliffe of Kentucky. Though Yulee converted to Christianity (Episcopalian) and raised their children as Christian, he encountered antisemitism throughout his career.

Yulee was in favor of slavery and the secession of Florida. After the Civil War, he was imprisoned at Fort Pulaski for nine months for having aided the escape of Confederate President Jefferson Davis. After being pardoned by President Andrew Johnson, he returned to his Florida railroad interests and other business ventures.

Early life and education
He was born David Levy in Charlotte Amalie, on the island of St. Thomas. His father was Moses Elias Levy, a Sephardi Jewish businessman from Morocco who made a fortune in lumber in the British colony. His mother, Hannah Abendanone, was also Sephardi; her ancestors had gone from Spain in the 15th-century expulsion to the Protestant Netherlands and England. Some later migrated to the Caribbean as English colonists during the British occupation of the Danish West Indies (now the United States Virgin Islands). Moses Levy was a first cousin and business partner of Phillip Benjamin, the father of Judah P. Benjamin, the future Secretary of State of the Confederate States of America.

After the family immigrated to the United States in the early 1820s, Moses Levy bought  of land near present-day Jacksonville, Florida Territory.  He wanted to establish a "New Jerusalem" for Jewish settlers.  The parents sent their son to a boy's academy and college in Norfolk, Virginia.  Levy studied law with Robert R. Reid in St. Augustine, was admitted to the bar in 1832, and started a practice in St. Augustine.

Early political career
During his twenties, Levy served in the territorial militia, including during the Second Seminole War. In 1834 he was present at a conference with Seminole chiefs, including Osceola.

In 1836 he was elected to the Florida Territory's Legislative Council, serving from 1837 to 1839. He was a delegate to the territory's constitutional convention in 1838 and served as the legislature's clerk in 1841.

Florida businessman

In 1851 Yulee founded a  sugar cane plantation, built and maintained by enslaved African Americans, along the Homosassa River. The remains of his plantation, which was destroyed during the Civil War, are now the Yulee Sugar Mill Ruins State Historic Site. Yulee was also business partners with John William Pearson at Orange Springs, Florida, but he abandoned his idea of building a railroad in the area as tensions rose and war seemed imminent.

While living in Fernandina, Yulee began to develop a railroad across Florida. He had planned since 1837 to build a state-owned system.  He became the first Southerner to use state grants under the Florida Internal Improvement Act of 1855, passed to encourage the development of such infrastructure. He made extensive use of the act to secure federal and state land grants "as a basis of credit" to acquire land and build railroad networks, which were built with slave and Irish immigrant labor through the Florida wilderness.

Issuing public stock, Yulee chartered the Florida Railroad in 1853. He planned its eastern and western terminals at deep-water ports, Fernandina (Port of Fernandina) on Amelia Island on the Atlantic side, and Cedar Key on the Gulf of Mexico, to provide for connection to ocean-going shipping. His company began construction in 1855.  On March 1, 1861, the first train arrived from the east in Cedar Key, just weeks before the beginning of the Civil War.

Political career
Levy (still going by that surname) was elected in 1841 as the delegate from the Florida Territory to the United States House of Representatives and served four years.  He was seated after his election, but his position was disputed, as opponents argued that he was not a citizen. Levy agreed to suspend his legislative activities pending resolution of this issue in the next Congressional session.  By late March 1842 the associated investigations, committee votes, and attempts to bring the issue to a vote in the full House, which included a defense by Levy and testimony from witnesses favorable to him, had not produced a definitive opinion of the House. Levy was allowed to take his seat, and no further attempts were made to contest his claim to it. Once seated in the House, Levy worked to gain statehood for the territory and to protect the expansion of slavery in other newly admitted states.

In 1845, after Florida was admitted as a state, the legislature elected Levy as a Democrat to the United States Senate, the first Jew in the United States to win a seat in the Senate. He served until 1851 (during which period he began using Yulee as his surname). During his first Senate term, he served as chairman of the United States Senate Committee on Private Land Claims (1845–1849) and the United States Senate Committee on Naval Affairs (1849–1851).

In 1855 Yulee was again elected by the Florida legislature to the Senate. He served until resigning in 1861 in order to support the Confederacy at the start of the American Civil War.

Yulee's inflammatory pro-slavery rhetoric in the Senate earned him the nickname "Florida Fire-Eater". Although he frequently denied that he favored secession, Yulee and his colleague, Senator Stephen Mallory, jointly requested from the War Department a statement of munitions and equipment in Florida forts on January 2, 1860. He wrote to a friend in the state, "the immediately important thing to be done is the occupation of the forts and arsenals in Florida."

Civil War
During the Civil War, Yulee did not seek any elective or appointive office. There is some dispute as to his wartime legislative service as some sources state that he served in the Confederate Congress and others do not. After the war, Yulee was imprisoned in Fort Pulaski for nine months for treason, specifically for aiding in the 1865 escape of Jefferson Davis.

Reconstruction
After receiving a pardon and being released from confinement, Yulee returned to Florida and rebuilt the Yulee Railroad, which had been destroyed by warfare. He served as president of the Florida Railroad Company from 1853 to 1866, as well as president of the Peninsular Railroad, Tropical Florida Railway, and Fernandina and Jacksonville Railroad companies. His development of the railroads in Florida was his most important achievement and contribution to the state. He was called the "Father of Florida Railroads".  His leadership helped bring increased economic development to the state, including the late nineteenth-century tourist trade. In 1870 Yulee hosted President Ulysses S. Grant in Fernandina.

Marriage and family
In 1846, Levy officially changed his name to David Levy Yulee by an act of the Florida Legislature, adding his father's Sephardic surname.  That year he married Nancy Christian Wickliffe, the daughter of Charles A. Wickliffe, the former governor of Kentucky and Postmaster General under President John Tyler. His wife was Christian, and they raised their children in her faith.

Death and legacy
Selling the Florida Railroad, he retired with his wife to Washington, D.C. in 1880, where she had a family. Yulee died six years later while visiting in New York City. Yulee was buried at Oak Hill Cemetery in Washington, D.C.

Both the town of Yulee, Florida and Levy County, Florida are named for him.
The town of Fernandina Beach, Florida has a statue of Yulee.
In 2000, the Florida Department of State designated Levy Yulee as a Great Floridian in the Great Floridians 2000 Program. Award plaques in his honor were installed at both the Fernandina Chamber of Commerce and the Yulee Sugar Mill Ruins State Historic Site.
The World War II Liberty Ship  was named in his honor.

See also
List of Hispanic and Latino Americans in the United States Congress
List of Jewish members of the United States Congress
List of United States senators born outside the United States

Archival material
The George A. Smathers Libraries at the University of Florida have a collection of David Levy Yulee Papers (1842–1886). Some of the material has been digitized.

References

External links
 
 
 Detailed biography, Yulee Railroad Days website
Guide to the David L. Yulee Papers, University of Florida]

Biography, Jewish Virtual Library

|-

|-

1810 births
1886 deaths
19th-century American politicians
19th-century American railroad executives
American Fire-Eaters
American people of Moroccan-Jewish descent
American people of Spanish-Jewish descent
American people of United States Virgin Islands descent
American politicians of Moroccan descent
American Presbyterians
American proslavery activists
American Sephardic Jews
Jewish-American slave owners
British Virgin Islands people
Burials at Oak Hill Cemetery (Washington, D.C.)
Converts to Calvinism from Judaism
Danish emigrants to the United States
Danish Sephardi Jews
Delegates to the United States House of Representatives from Florida Territory
Democratic Party United States senators from Florida
Florida Democrats
Florida lawyers
Forerunners of Zionism
Mizrahi Jews
Jewish American state legislators in Florida
Jewish Confederates
Jewish members of the United States House of Representatives
Jewish United States senators
Levy County, Florida
Members of the Florida Territorial Legislature
People of Florida in the American Civil War
People from Fernandina Beach, Florida
Recipients of American presidential pardons
United States Virgin Islands Jews
19th-century American lawyers
United States senators who owned slaves